Crawford Adventist Academy is a K– grade 12 Adventist private day-school in Toronto, Ontario, Canada. The school is divided into two sections, the elementary, which consists of grades JK-8 under the supervision of principal Mrs. Burgin-Hall and the high school, which consistis of grades 9-12 under the supervision of principal Mr. Thompson. The campus is located next to the 1000+ member Willowdale Adventist Church, and the previously SDA owned North York General Hospital Branson Site. Owned and operated by the Seventh-day Adventist Church, Crawford maintains three campuses – the main school in the north part of Toronto, a second K–6 campus called Crawford East and a campus in Peel Region. Crawford has over 700 students overall.

Crawford Adventist Academy Toronto Campus is the centrepiece of the Toronto Adventist District School Board (TADSB), which also runs the third school called Peel Adventist School.  The TADSB is under the jurisdiction of the Ontario Conference of Seventh-day Adventists.

History

Crawford Adventist Academy (CAA) first began in 1953 when it located in a church ----at the corner of Church Street and Yonge street.  It was called Willowdale SDA church school at that time.  It became Toronto Junior Academy when it moved to the 555 Finch Avenue Campus. ---- It grew from Toronto Junior Academy to Crawford Adventist Academy and has provided a full grade 12 program since the early 1980s . From that time it has been considered one of the Seventh-day Adventist Church's major educational endeavours in Canada.

Curriculum

Crawford Adventist Academy offers religious education along with the prescribed Ontario curriculum.

See also

 List of Seventh-day Adventist secondary schools
 Seventh-day Adventist education
Seventh-day Adventist Church in Canada

References

External links
 Toronto Adventist District School Board
 Seventh-day Adventist Ontario Conference Office of Education
 Photo of Crawford Adventist Academy

High schools in Toronto
Private schools in Toronto
Adventist secondary schools in Canada
Christian schools in Canada
Educational institutions established in 1953
1953 establishments in Ontario